M. africana may refer to:
 Malcolmia africana, the African mustard, a plant species
 Mirafra africana, the rufous-naped lark, a bird species
 Mustela africana, the Amazon weasel  or Tropical Weasel, a weasel species found in the Amazon Rainforest in Brazil

See also
 Africana (disambiguation)